Chepstow East railway station was a temporary station on the South Wales Railway (now the Gloucester to Newport Line). It was on the opposite bank of the River Wye from Chepstow and was only used for a few months until the river was crossed by a railway bridge. This was about a mile from Chepstow railway station, at the road bridge close to the future junction of the Wye Valley line (which opened in November 1876). It was opened on 19 September 1851 and served as a temporary station while the Chepstow railway bridge was being constructed across the river to link up with the rest of the line. It closed on 19 July 1852, the day that the bridge over the Wye was opened.

Another station, Tutshill for Beachley Halt was opened in 1934 at a close location.

References

Disused railway stations in Gloucestershire
Former Great Western Railway stations
Railway stations in Great Britain opened in 1851
Railway stations in Great Britain closed in 1852
Chepstow
1851 establishments in England
Tidenham